Edward J. McKenna  was a professional baseball player who played in 32 games for the 1884 Washington Nationals of the Union Association.

References

External links

Major League Baseball catchers
Major League Baseball outfielders
Baseball players from Missouri
19th-century baseball players
Washington Nationals (UA) players
Year of death missing
Wilmington Quicksteps (minor league) players
Oshkosh (minor league baseball) players
Year of birth missing